Air Nova was a regional airline based in Enfield, Nova Scotia, Canada that became part of Air Canada Regional in 2001. In 2002 the merger of Air BC, Air Ontario, Air Nova and Canadian Regional Airlines was finalised with the launch of a new name and brand-Air Canada Jazz.

History  
After the consolidation of Air Alliance, Air Nova served 28 destinations throughout Eastern Canada and the United States.

Air Nova was a wholly owned subsidiary of Air Canada.

Fleet
At the time of its merger in 2000, the Air Nova fleet consists of the following aircraft:

See also 
 List of defunct airlines of Canada

References

External links

Air Nova archived website

Air Canada
Defunct airlines of Canada
Airlines established in 1986
Airlines disestablished in 2001
1986 establishments in Nova Scotia
2001 disestablishments in Nova Scotia
Canadian companies established in 1986
Companies based in Halifax, Nova Scotia
Former Star Alliance affiliate members
Canadian companies disestablished in 2001